Utpal Chatterjee  (born 13 July 1964) is a former Indian cricketer. He was a left arm spinner and a low order batsman. He had his early education at the Shyambazar A.V School and Calcutta Boys' School in Kolkata, India.

He played domestic cricket for Bengal and played three One Day Internationals for India in 1995. He is the only cricketer ever from Bengal to have picked up more than 500 first class wickets.
He picked up 52 wickets in the ranji trophy' season of 1999–2000. He retired in 2004 with 504 first class Wicket's to his credit.

Since 4 September 2008, he has been the head coach of Bengal cricket team.

External links

Bengal cricketers
Indian cricketers
India One Day International cricketers
East Zone cricketers
1964 births
Living people
University of Calcutta alumni
Cricketers from Kolkata
Indian cricket coaches